Rock Action is the third studio album by Scottish post-rock band Mogwai. The album was produced by Dave Fridmann of Mercury Rev in New York.

Overview
Rock Action brought with it some changes to Mogwai's sound that they would continue to develop later, including the use of electronic instruments. While song structures on this album are typical of the band in most cases and respects, some of the contrasting dynamics have been toned down slightly and many of the songs focus more on texture than on structure. For the first time, Mogwai utilised synthesizers, expanding their timbral palette. The tone of Rock Action is somewhat less dark than previous works, but maintains Mogwai's cryptic cynicism.

The single "Dial: Revenge" features Welsh vocals from Gruff Rhys of Super Furry Animals. Rhys has said of the song title: "I think (Mogwai) were into me writing in Welsh, because they're an instrumental band and they wanted a singer who would be just sounds for most people. Back then, people were still using payphones. When you take a payphone off the hook, on the LCD screen it flashes 'DIAL'. But in Welsh, dial – pronounced 'dee-al' – means revenge. It puts you in a weird place when you're making a phone call. So the song was about that." The song "2 "Rights Make 1 Wrong" was originally titled "Banjo".

The photographs that make up the artwork for the album were taken in a bar in Glasgow called Nice 'n' Sleazy. When the inside cover is unfolded, part of the logo for Mwng, an album by Super Furry Animals released the previous year, can be seen.

In 2009, Rock Action was awarded a gold certification from the Independent Music Companies Association, which indicated sales of at least 100,000 copies throughout Europe.

Track listing

Personnel
Mogwai
 Dominic Aitchison – bass
 Stuart Braithwaite – guitar, vocals
 Martin Bulloch – drums
 Barry Burns – guitar, keyboard, vocoder
 John Cummings – guitar, piano

Additional musicians
 David Pajo – backing vocals on "Take Me Somewhere Nice"
 Gruff Rhys – vocals on "Dial: Revenge", backing vocals on "2 Rights Make 1 Wrong"
 The Remote Viewer – programming and banjo on "2 Rights Make 1 Wrong"
 Willie Campbell – backing vocals on "2 Rights Make 1 Wrong"
 Charlie Clark – backing vocals on "2 Rights Make 1 Wrong"
 Gary Lightbody – backing vocals on "2 Rights Make 1 Wrong"
 Michael Brawley – strings and horns on "Take Me Somewhere Nice" and "2 Rights Make 1 Wrong"
 Dave Fridmann – strings and horns on "Dial: Revenge" and "Secret Pint"

Production
 Dave Fridmann – production, mixing, recording
 Tony Doogan – recording
 Willie Deans – engineering (assistant, at CaVa Studios)
 Bill Racine – engineering (assistant, at Sorcerer Sound Studios)
 Vella Design – design, art
 Steve Gullick – photography

Charts

References

2001 albums
Mogwai albums
Matador Records albums
Albums produced by Dave Fridmann
Albums recorded at Tarbox Road Studios